Kristina Sirum Novak (born 29 August 2000) is a Norwegian handball player who plays for Sola HK in REMA 1000-ligaen and the Norwegian national team.

She also represented Norway at the 2018 Women's Youth World Handball Championship, placing 11th.

She made her debut on the Norwegian national team on 21 April 2022, against North Macedonia.

Achievements 
European Championship:
Winner: 2022
REMA 1000-ligaen
Bronze: 2020/21, 2021/22
Norwegian Cup
 Silver: 2020, 2022/2023

Personal life
She is the daughter of a Norwegian mother and Croatian father. She hails from Håbafjell in Sandnes and is the younger sister of sister Kristian Novak.

References

2000 births
Living people
People from Sandnes
Norwegian people of Croatian descent
Norwegian female handball players
Sportspeople from Rogaland
21st-century Norwegian women